Joseph A. Presel (December 23, 1941 – December 19, 2021) was an American diplomat who served as United States Ambassador to Uzbekistan.

Career
Presel joined the Foreign Service in 1963 and has specialized in Russian, multilateral diplomacy, and political military affairs.  He has served in Turkey, France, Moscow, Belgrade (as Deputy Chief of Mission), and twice in the U.S. Arms Control Delegation in Vienna, the second time as Deputy U.S. Representative. His Washington service includes two assignments to the Arms Control and Disarmament Agency, service in the European, Politico-Military, International Organizations and INR bureaus, as well as several assignments in the offices of Department of State principals.

Ambassador Presel, of Rhode Island, served as the Coordinator for Regional Affairs in the New Independent States since 1993 and became Special Negotiator for Nagorno-Karabakh in 1995, with the rank of Ambassador.

The President nominated Presel, a career member of the Senior Foreign Service, Class of Minister-Counselor, to be Ambassador to the Republic of Uzbekistan. Joseph Presel was appointed to this post on November 10, 1997, and presented his credentials to President Islam Karimov on December 3, 1997. Ambassador Presel left Uzbekistan on October 21, 2000.

Life
Presel was a graduate of Harvard College, and studied at St. Antony's College, Oxford University. He is married to Claire-Lise Junod Presel.

References

External links
Bio at Tashkent Embassy web site
The Political Graveyard: Index to Politicians: Presel to Prestine

1941 births
2021 deaths
Ambassadors of the United States to Uzbekistan
Harvard College alumni
Alumni of St Antony's College, Oxford
United States Foreign Service personnel
People from Providence, Rhode Island